The year 1545 in science and technology involved some significant events.

Botany
 Orto botanico di Padova and di Firenze botanical gardens established.

Mathematics
 Gerolamo Cardano publishes his algebra text Ars Magna, including the first published solutions to cubic and quartic equations.

Navigation
 Pedro de Medina's Arte de navegar is published in Valladolid, the first treatise on the art of navigation to be published in Europe.

Physiology and medicine
 Charles Estienne publishes De dissectione partium corporis humani, libri tres, including a description of the venous valves of the liver.
 Ambroise Paré publishes his first book, a treatise on battlefield medicine, in Paris.
 Thomas Phaer publishes The Boke of Chyldren, the first book on paediatrics written in English.

Zoology
 The giant squid (Architeuthis) is first seen.

Births
 January 11 – Guidobaldo del Monte, Italian mathematician (died 1607)
 March – Gaspare Tagliacozzi, Italian anatomist (died 1599)
 John Gerard, English botanist (died 1612)

Deaths
 Christoph Rudolff, Silesian mathematician (born 1499)

References

 
16th century in science
1540s in science